Martin Barbarič (14 October 1970 – 18 January 2013) was a Czech football player who is best known as key striker at club Slovan Liberec in the late 1990s. He was also a U-11 coach at FC Hradec Králové.

On 11 January 2013 Barbarič shot and killed his ex-wife in Hradec Králové. He then shot himself and was taken to the hospital in critical condition. He died a week later.

References

External links 

FC Hradec Králové
 

1970 births
2013 deaths
Czech footballers
Czech expatriate footballers
FC Hradec Králové players
FC Slovan Liberec players
FC Fastav Zlín players
Czech First League players
Czech murderers
Suicides by firearm in the Czech Republic
Murder–suicides in Europe
Association football forwards
2013 suicides
Sportspeople from Hradec Králové